Mystery of Snow (Hlyo-hwat-thaw-hnin;) is a 2005 Burmese musical adventure drama film directed by Sin Yaw Mg Mg. The film picked up seven Myanmar Academy Awards including Best Film, Best Director, Best Supporting Actor, Best Scriptwriter, Best Cinematography, Best Film Editing and Best Sound

Cast
Lwin Moe as Okkar
Nyunt Win as The Guide
Lu Min as The Guide's Son
Soe Myat Nandar as The Guide's Daughter

International release
According to director Zin Yaw Maung Maung, he had to work in conjunction with the Ministry of Information to help get the film onto the international circuit. He was quoted as saying “I know it is out of the question to get the money back that was invested in this film [more than US $160,000] if we only show it in Myanmar,” he said. “That is why I decided to distribute it in foreign countries.”

References

External links
 
http://www.sinyawmgmg.com Sin Yaw Mg Mg Official Website

2005 films
Burmese drama films
2000s adventure films
2000s musical drama films
2005 drama films